Kodathi Samaksham Balan Vakkeel is a 2019 Indian Malayalam-language legal drama-mystery comedy film, written and directed by B. Unnikrishnan, and produced by Viacom18 Motion Pictures. The film stars Dileep, Mamta Mohandas, Priya Anand, Harish Uthaman, Siddique and Aju Varghese. It follows Balakrishnan, an advocate with a stutter.

Plot
A raid takes place on the car of a huge businessman, Ronald (Harish Uthaman).  are found in the car and taken away by the police.

The story then shifts to Balan (Dileep Pillai), an advocate who hasn't made much in life due to his stutter. He is finally successful in a case that granted bail for his client Anzar (Aju Varghese). After Anzar offers a house in a crooked colony for Balan instead of his fees, he is kicked out of the house by Babu (Bheeman Raghu). He leaves to his house in his hometown where his father (Siddique) and mother (Bindu Panicker) stay. After some unfortunate events, Balan's brother-in-law (Suraj Venjaramoodu) entrusts him with a complicated case .
Balan solves the case due to his love for Anuradha. The police chief was part of that cash of  confiscated by police. His nexus with Ronaldo and Tina is filmed by intelligent father of Anuradha who asks  but DG gets him killed. Father kept secret in bank locker. He has taught his daughter to solve puzzles. With that ability she helps Balan with major leads in the case and rest of the story is how they solve this mystery.

Cast

Dileep as Adv. Balakrishnan Pillai
Mamta Mohandas as Anuradha Sudarshan
Priya Anand as Teena Shankar
Harish Uthaman as Ronald
Siddique as Somasekharan Pillai, Balakrishnan's Father
Aju Varghese as Ansar Ali Khan
Renji Panicker as DGP K. E. Eappan
Suraj Venjaramoodu as SI P. Mohanan Pillai
K. B. Ganesh Kumar as Vincent Thomas
Bheeman Raghu as Irumbu Babu
Saiju Kurup as Judge Vidhyadharan/ Friend of Balakrishnan Pillai who studied with before Ernakulam Law College
Bindu Panicker as Vishalam, Balakrishnan's Mother
 Lena as ADGP Indulekha Marar
 Rajesh Sharma as Sudarshan, Anuradha's Father
 Vamsi Krishna as A.C.P Ratnavel
 Veena Nair as Beena
 Thesni Khan as Anuradha's Stepmother 
 Kottayam Pradeep as Chacko, Court Attender
 Shobha Mohan as Vidhyadharan's Mother
 Arjun Nandhakumar as Adv. Pramod 
 Sajid Yahiya as Stranger
 Dinesh Panicker as Home Minister Radhakrishnan
 Uma Nair as Public Prosecutor
 Poojappura Radhakrishnan as Tea Shop Owner
 Priyanka as Tea Shop Owner's Wife
 Sharika Menon as Balan's Sister
 Nandu Poduwal as Thaddeus
 Aparna Nair as Lady Seeking Divorce
 Niveditha as Young Anuradha(In the song Onnum mindathe)
 Baby as Colony lady
 Mary as Colony lady
 Neha Iyer as herself in the song "Babuetta"

Production
Unnikrishnan initially visualised the story with Mohanlal in mind for Balakrishnan, which he conceived in 2014. When he told the one-line story, Mohanlal suggested Dileep would better suit the character. The film was produced by Viacom18 Motion Pictures and marks their debut in Malayalam cinema.

Music
Rahul Raj was initially signed in as the composer. But as the project was pushed to October, Rahul Raj had to opt out after composing two songs, "Then Panimathiye" and "Thaniye Itha" since he had to be in Berklee, Spain. The other two songs, "Babuvetta" and "Onnum Mindaathe" were thus composed by Gopi Sunder

Marketing and release
The teaser trailer video of Kodathi Samaksham Balan Vakeel was released on 27 December 2018. The theatrical trailer of Kodathi Samaksham Balan Vakeel was released on 24 January 2019. The film was released on 21 February 2019.

Reception

Box office
The film grossed around $47,728 from the US in its lifetime. It grossed $8,546(NZ$12,484)(₹5.91 lakhs) from New Zealand.

Critical response 
News18 rated 3.5 in a scale of 5 and wrote that the film "blends all the right ingredients of populist cinema and emerges victorious". The New Indian Express critic also rated it 3.5 out of 5 and commented: "The film makes it obvious from early on that it was not designed to provide any sort of intellectual stimulation, and any attempt to seek the same would be an exercise in futility. It's more interested in playing to the gallery and should be approached in the same way as you would any commercial entertainer". The Times of India critic rated 3.5 out of 5 stars and wrote that it is a "run-of-the-mill thriller made for you to like and be in awe of the hero. It is demanding you to like him and root for him, sometimes out of sympathy and the other times for his intelligence. It is a story entirely revolving around that need to urge you to like him and appreciate his Sherlock-ian intelligence". Sify's critic called it an "average thriller" and rated 3.5 in a scale of 5 and said the film "ends up as an okay one time watch, packaged for those who don’t need much to be thrilled".

Remake
In late February 2019, Unnikrishnan said: "Viacom is considering remaking the movie and discussions are in the initial stages. We are talking to both Akshay Kumar and Shah Rukh Khan for starring in the movie".

References

External links

2010s Malayalam-language films
Indian courtroom films
Films scored by Rahul Raj
Films scored by Gopi Sundar
Films directed by B. Unnikrishnan